James Simeon McCuaig (September 29, 1819 – August 4, 1888) was a businessman and political figure in Ontario, Canada. He represented Prince Edward in the Legislative Assembly of Ontario in 1872, and in the House of Commons of Canada as a Conservative member from 1879 to 1882.

He was born in Picton in Upper Canada in 1819, the son of John McCuaig, was educated there and established himself in business in Picton. He owned steamships that operated on Lake Ontario and Lake Erie. McCuaig served two years as Inspector of Provincial Canals. He ran unsuccessfully for a seat in the assembly for the Province of Canada in 1854. McCuaig was elected to the provincial assembly in a by-election in 1872 but resigned his seat to run unsuccessfully for the federal parliament later that year. He was elected to the House of Commons in 1878 supporting temperance in Prince Edward County.

McCuaig was married twice: first to Julia Isabella Glass and then to Maria Augusta Pope. He died near Picton at the age of 68.

References

External links

1819 births
1888 deaths
Conservative Party of Canada (1867–1942) MPs
Progressive Conservative Party of Ontario MPPs
Members of the House of Commons of Canada from Ontario
People from Prince Edward County, Ontario